The Story of Sonny Boy Slim is the second studio album by American blues rock musician Gary Clark Jr., released on September 11, 2015, through Warner Bros. Records. The album features 13 originals tracks and showcases many of Clark's signature moves. Clark blends his usual styles of blues, rock and soul music, with occasional touches of hip hop and R&B, to create his signature sound.

The album's title was created by blending his two childhood nicknames. Sonny Boy was the nickname his mother gave him, Slim was given to him on the Austin Texas blues scene and referred to his tall and thin physical build.

It reached number one on the Billboard Top Blues Albums chart in October that year.

Track listing
All tracks are written by Gary Clark Jr., except where noted.

Charts

Weekly charts

Year-end charts

Personnel
Adapted from the album's liner notes.

 Gary Clark, Jr.– all vocals, guitars, bass, drums, and keyboards, except where noted below (plus harmonica on track 5, snaps on 4, and claps on 12)
 Christopher Copeland– intro on "The Healing"
 Nicole Trunfio and Zion Rain Clark– intro on "Hold On"
 Johnny Bradley– bass (tracks 1, 7, and 12)
 Jason Frey– baritone sax (3), tenor sax (4, 6, 7, 9)
 Bharath "Cheex" Ramanath– synth (3), snaps (4), claps (12)
 Hard Proof Horns (4, 6, 7, 9)
 Derek Phelps– trumpet
 Jason Frey– tenor sax
 Joe Woullard– baritone sax and flute
 Lewis Stephens– organ and piano (5, 7), organ (10)
 Johnny Radelat– drums on "Cold Blooded"
 J.J. Johnson– drums on "Can't Sleep"
 Jacob Sciba– bass on "Stay"
 King Zapata– guitar on "Stay"
 Jay Moeller– drums on "Shake"
 Shawn Clark and Savannah Clark– backing vocals (1, 3, 5)
 Tameca Jones– backing vocals on "Wings"

References

External links

2015 albums
Gary Clark Jr. albums
Warner Records albums